Łeba is a PKP railway station in Łeba (Pomeranian Voivodeship), Poland.

Lines crossing the station

References 
Łeba article at Polish Stations Database, URL accessed at 18 March 2006

Railway stations in Pomeranian Voivodeship
Lębork County